Connor Reece Mountain (born 26 August 1997) is a speedway rider from England.

Career
Mountain began his British speedway career riding for Coventry Bees in 2015. In 2021, he rode in the top tier of British Speedway, riding for the King's Lynn Stars in the SGB Premiership in addition to riding for the Newcastle Diamonds in the SGB Championship.

In 2022, he rode for the Sheffield Tigers in the SGB Premiership and for the Leicester Lions in the Championship. He helped Sheffield win the League cup and reach the Play off final.

In 2023, he signed for Scunthorpe Scorpions for the SGB Championship 2023.

References 

1997 births
Living people
British speedway riders
Ipswich Witches riders
King's Lynn Stars riders
Leicester Lions riders
Newcastle Diamonds riders
Scunthorpe Scorpions riders
Sheffield Tigers riders
Swindon Robins riders